Cheon Jun-ho (Korean: 천준호; born 15 February 1971) is a South Korean politician who is currently the representative of the Gangbuk A constituency in the National Assembly of South Korea. He is a member of the Democratic Party of Korea.

Early life and education 
Cheon was born in Seoul, South Korea on February 15, 1971. He graduated from Kyung Hee University with a degree in history.

Political career 
Cheon is known for work protecting cultural heritage sites and environmental preservation. In 2005, he served as the Co-Chairman of the Citizen's Union Against the Construction of Apartments at the Deoksugung Palace and successfully stopped the construction of the apartment complex. He also served as the Executive Director of the Roh Moo-hyun and Kim Dae-Jung Citizen Remembrance Committee in 2009. He continued to work in both minor and major citizens' movements until 2010.

From 2011, he began working as the planning adviser and personal assistant to Mayor of Seoul, Park Won-soon. He joined the Democratic Party of Korea in February 2016 and was nominated as the party's candidate for the Gangbuk A constituency in the 2016 South Korean legislative election but lost to Cheong Yang-seog. He ran for the same constituency in the 2020 South Korean legislative election and defeated Cheong Yang-seog.

Electoral history

See also 

 Mayor of Seoul
 2020 South Korean legislative election

References 

1971 births
Living people
Minjoo Party of Korea politicians
People from Seoul
Members of the National Assembly (South Korea)